Serbia competed at the 2012 Summer Olympics in London. This was the nation's third appearance at the Summer Olympics.

The Olympic Committee of Serbia sent a total of 116 athletes to the Games, 80 men and 46 women, to compete in 15 sports. Volleyball, men's handball, men's water polo were the only team-based sports in which Serbia had its representation in these Olympic games. Among the sports played by the athletes, Serbia marked its Olympic debut in taekwondo.

Notable Serbian athletes featured butterfly swimmer and Olympic silver medalist Milorad Čavić, and world number-one male tennis player and Olympic bronze medalist Novak Djokovic, who was the nation's flag bearer at the opening ceremony. Pistol shooter and Olympic gold medalist Jasna Šekarić, the oldest of the team at age 47, became the first Serbian athlete to compete in seven Olympic games, and played as an individual competitor under five different banners. Two athletes, on the other hand, made their sixth Olympic appearance: rifle shooter Nemanja Mirosavljev, and high jumper Dragutin Topić. Water polo player Dušan Mandić, at age 18, was the youngest athlete of the team.

Serbia left London with a total of four Olympic medals (one gold, one silver, and two bronze). Taekwondo jin Milica Mandić won Serbia's first ever gold medal in Olympic history as an independent nation. Meanwhile, the men's national water polo team managed to repeat its bronze medal from Beijing. Two other medals were awarded to the athletes in shooting.

Medalists 

| width="78%" align="left" valign="top" |

| width="22%" align="left" valign="top" |

Competitors

Athletics

Serbian athletes qualified in this athletics events (up to a maximum of 3 athletes in each event at the 'A' Standard, and 1 at the 'B' Standard):

Men
Track & road events

Field events

Combined events – Decathlon

Women
Track & road events

Field events

Boxing

Men

Canoeing

Sprint
Men

Women

Qualification Legend: FA = Qualify to final (medal); FB = Qualify to final B (non-medal)

Cycling

Road

Handball

Serbia qualified a team in the men's tournament.

Men's tournament

Team roster

Reserve player: Žarko Šešum
Group play

Judo

Rowing

Men

Qualification Legend: FA=Final A (medal); FB=Final B (non-medal); FC=Final C (non-medal); FD=Final D (non-medal); FE=Final E (non-medal); FF=Final F (non-medal); SA/B=Semifinals A/B; SC/D=Semifinals C/D; SE/F=Semifinals E/F; QF=Quarterfinals; R=Repechage

Shooting

Men

Women

Swimming

Qualifiers for the latter rounds (Q) of all events were decided on a time only basis, therefore positions shown are overall results versus competitors in all heats.

Men

Women

Table tennis

Taekwondo

Tennis

Men

Women

Mixed

Volleyball

Indoor

Men's tournament
Team roster

Group play

Women's tournament
Team roster

Group play

Water polo

Serbia will participate in the men's tournament.

Men's tournament 

Roster

Group play

Quarterfinal

Semifinal

Bronze medal match

Wrestling 

Men's Greco-Roman

See also

 Serbia at the 2012 Summer Paralympics

References

External links

 The list of qualified athletes

Nations at the 2012 Summer Olympics
2012
2012 in Serbian sport